The Swanton Covered Railroad Bridge was a covered bridge in Swanton, Vermont.  Built in 1898, it carried the St. Johnsbury and Lamoille County Railroad across the Missisquoi River just west of Swanton village.  It was destroyed by fire in 1987, and its site is now occupied by the former West Milton Bridge.  The bridge was listed on the National Register of Historic Places in 1973, and has not been delisted despite its destruction.

Description and history
The former St. Johnsbury and Lamoille Railroad right of way runs generally easterly from the north-south main line of the Central Vermont Railroad, which runs roughly parallel to the west bank of the north-flowing Missisquoi River west of Swanton village. The bridge was a distinctive combination of Pratt and Town trusses, and had a massive interlaced wooden deck system. Its exterior was finished in vertical board siding.

The bridge was built in 1895.  The railroad did not use the bridge after 1967 due to increased train weight, bypassing this section of the line by using the Central Vermont Richford subdivision to bring trains to St. Albans.  In 1973 the bridge was listed on the National Register; it had been out of service and was in deteriorating condition.  It was destroyed by an arson fire in 1987  The bridge site has since been replaced the trusses of the former West Milton Bridge, and now serves as part of a multi-use trail.

See also
 
 
 
 
 List of covered bridges in Vermont
 National Register of Historic Places listings in Franklin County, Vermont
 List of bridges on the National Register of Historic Places in Vermont

References

Covered bridges on the National Register of Historic Places in Vermont
National Register of Historic Places in Franklin County, Vermont
Transport infrastructure completed in 1898
Buildings and structures in Swanton, Vermont
Demolished bridges in the United States
Wooden bridges in Vermont
Lattice truss bridges in the United States
Railroad bridges in Vermont
Covered bridges in Franklin County, Vermont